Miss South Africa 2022, the 64th edition of the Miss South Africa pageant was held on Saturday, August 13, 2022, at the SunBet Arena in Pretoria.  Incumbent winner, Lalela Mswane of KwaZulu-Natal crowned Ndavi Nokeri of Limpopo as her successor. Nokeri will go on to represent South Africa at Miss Universe 2022, Miss World 2022 or Miss Supranational 2023.

Results 
Color keys

Delegates 
The official Top 10 finalists were revealed on 13 June 2022.

Top 30
The Top 30 were revealed on 16 May 2022. The following 20 delegates did not advance to the top ten.

Judges

Semifinals
The following seven judges determined the entrants who made it to the Top 30.
  Liesl Laurie-Mthombeni – Miss South Africa 2015
 Tracey-Lee Lusty Horwitz – Body positive activist and attorney
 Koo Govender – Media mogul and CEO of Dentsu South Africa
 Nobukhosi Mukwevho – Founder of Khosi Nkosi
 Makhosazana Zwane-Siguqa – Editor-in-chief of True Love magazine
 Simoné Pretorius – Actress, screenwriter and founder of Art of Acting SA
 Thando Thabethe – Media personality and entrepreneur

Final
 Thuli Madonsela – Advocate and professor of law
 Harnaaz Sandhu – Miss Universe 2021 from India
 Thando Thabethe – Media personality and entrepreneur
 Suzette van der Merwe – Miss South Africa 1990
 Devi Sankaree Govender – Investigative television journalist
 Rolene Strauss – Miss South Africa 2014 and Miss World 2014
 Zozibini Tunzi – Miss South Africa 2019 and Miss Universe 2019

References

2022
2022 beauty pageants
2022 in South Africa